The Cherokee Nation  (Cherokee: ᏣᎳᎩᎯ ᎠᏰᎵ, pronounced Tsalagihi Ayeli) was a legal, autonomous, tribal government in North America recognized from 1794 to 1907.  It was often referred to simply as "The Nation" by its inhabitants. The government was effectively disbanded in 1907, after its land rights had been extinguished, prior to the admission of Oklahoma as a state. During the late 20th century, the Cherokee people reorganized, instituting a government with sovereign jurisdiction known  as the Cherokee Nation. On July 9, 2020, the United States Supreme Court ruled that the Muscogee (Creek) Nation (and by extension the Cherokee Nation) had never been disestablished in the years before allotment and Oklahoma Statehood.

The Cherokee Nation consisted of the Cherokee (ᏣᎳᎩ —pronounced Tsalagi or Cha-la-gee) people of the Qualla Boundary and the southeastern United States; those who relocated voluntarily from the southeastern United States to the Indian Territory (circa 1820 —known as the "Old Settlers"); those who were forced by the Federal government of the United States to relocate (through the Indian Removal Act) by way of the Trail of Tears (1830s); and descendants of the Natchez, the Lenape and the Shawnee peoples, and, after the Civil War and emancipation of slaves, Cherokee Freedmen and their descendants.

The nation was recognized as a sovereign government; because the majority of its leaders allied with the Confederacy, the United States required a new peace treaty after the American Civil War, which also provided for emancipation of Cherokee slaves. The territory was partially occupied by United States. In the late 19th century, Congress passed the Dawes Act, intended to promote assimilation and extinguish Indian governments and land claims in preparation for the admission of Oklahoma as a state in 1907. After allotment of lands to households, all the Cherokee were considered state and United States citizens.

History 

The Cherokee called themselves the Ani-Yun' wiya. In their language; this meant "leading" or "principal" people. Before 1794, the Cherokee had no standing national government. Its people were highly decentralized and lived in bands and clans according to a matrilineal kinship system. The people lived in towns located in scattered autonomous tribal areas related by kinship throughout the southern Appalachia region. Various leaders were periodically appointed (by mutual consent of the towns) to represent the towns or bands to French, British and, later, United States authorities as was needed. The Cherokee knew this leader as "First Beloved Man" —or Uku. The English had translated this as "chief".

The chief's function was to serve as focal point for negotiations with the encroaching Europeans. Hanging Maw was recognized as a chief by the United States government, but not by the majority of Cherokee peoples.

At the end of the Cherokee–American wars (1794), Little Turkey was recognized as "Principal Chief of the Cherokee Nation" by all the towns. At that time, Cherokee communities continued in lands claimed by the states of North Carolina, South Carolina, Georgia, and the Overhill area, located in present-day eastern Tennessee. 

The break-away Chickamauga band (or Lower Cherokee), under War Chief Dragging Canoe (Tsiyugunsini, 1738–1792), had retreated to and inhabited a mountainous area in what later became the northeastern part of the future state of Alabama.

U.S. president George Washington sought to "civilize" the southeastern American Indians, through programs overseen by US Indian Agent Benjamin Hawkins. Facilitated by the destruction of many Indian towns during the American Revolutionary War, U.S. land agents encouraged Native Americans to abandon their historic communal-land tenure and settle on isolated subsistence farmsteads. Over-harvesting by the deerskin trade had brought white-tailed deer in the region to the brink of extinction. Americans introduced pig and cattle raising, and these animals replaced deer as the principal sources of meat. The Americans supplied the tribes with spinning wheels and cotton-seed, and men were taught to fence and plow the land. (In the Cherokee traditional division of labor, most cultivation for farming was done by women.) Women were instructed in weaving. Eventually, blacksmiths, gristmills and cotton plantations (along with slave labor) were established.

Succeeding Little Turkey as Principal Chief were Black Fox (1801–1811) and Pathkiller (1811–1827), both former warriors of Dragging Canoe. "The separation", a phrase which the Cherokee used to describe the period after 1776, when the Chickamauga had left other bands that were in close proximity to Anglo-American settlements, officially ended at the Cherokee reunification council of 1809.

Three important veterans of the Cherokee–American wars, James Vann (a successful businessman) and his two protégés, The Ridge (also called Ganundalegi or "Major" Ridge) and Charles R. Hicks, made up the younger 'Cherokee Triumvirate.'  These leaders advocated  acculturation of the people, formal education of the young, and introduction of European-American farming methods. In 1801 they invited Moravian missionaries to their territory from North Carolina to teach Christianity and the 'arts of civilized life.' The Moravian, and later Congregationalist, missionaries also ran boarding schools. A select few students were chosen to be educated at the American Board of Commissioners for Foreign Missions school in Connecticut.

These men continued to be leaders in the tribe. Hicks participated in the Red Stick War, a civil war between traditional and progressive Creek factions. This coincided with part of US involvement in the War of 1812 against Great Britain. He was the de facto principal chief from 1813–1827.

Constitutional governments 
The Cherokee Nation—East had first created electoral districts in 1817. By 1822, the Cherokee Supreme Court was founded. Lastly, the Cherokee Nation adopted a written constitution in 1827 that created a government with three branches: legislative, executive, and judicial. The Principal Chief was elected by the National Council, which was the legislature of the Nation. A similar constitution was adopted by the Cherokee Nation—West in 1833.

The Constitution of the reunited Cherokee Nation was ratified at Tahlequah, Oklahoma on September 6, 1839, at the conclusion of "The Removal". The signing is commemorated every Labor Day weekend with the celebration of the Cherokee National Holiday.

Removal 

In 1802, the U.S. federal government promised representatives of the state of Georgia to extinguish Native American titles to internal Georgia lands in return for the state's formal cession of its unincorporated western claim (which was made part of the Mississippi Territory). Negotiating with states to give up western claims was part of the unfinished business from the American Revolution and establishing of the United States. European Americans were seeking more land in what became known as the Deep South because of the expansion of cotton plantations. Invention of the cotton gin had made short-staple cotton profitable, and it could be cultivated in the uplands of Georgia, Alabama, and Mississippi.  

In 1815, the US government established a Cherokee Reservation in the Arkansaw district of the Missouri Territory and tried to convince the Cherokee to move there voluntarily. The reservation boundaries extended from north of the Arkansas River to the southern bank of the White River. The Cherokee who moved to this reservation became known as the "Old Settlers" or Western Cherokee.

By additional treaties signed with the U.S., in 1817 (Treaty of the Cherokee Agency, 8 July 1817) and 1819 (Treaty of Washington, 27 February 1819), the Cherokee exchanged remaining communal lands in Georgia (north of the Hiwassee River), Tennessee, and North Carolina for lands in the Arkansaw Territory west of the Mississippi River. A majority of the remaining Cherokee resisted these treaties and refused to leave their lands east of the Mississippi. Finally, in 1830, the United States Congress enacted the Indian Removal Act to bolster the treaties and forcibly free up title to the lands desired by the states. At this time, one-third of the remaining Native Americans left voluntarily, especially because the act was being enforced by use of government troops and the Georgia militia. Although The Treaty of New Echota was not approved by the Cherokee National Council nor signed by Principal Chief John Ross, it was amended and ratified in March 1836, and became the legal basis for the forcible removal known as the Trail of Tears.

Most of the settlements were established in the area around the western capital of Tahlontiskee (near present-day Gore, Oklahoma).

Civil War and Reconstruction 

Within the Cherokee Nation, there were advocates for neutrality, a  Union alliance, and a  Confederate alliance. Two prominent Cherokee, John Ross and Stand Watie were slaveholders and shared some values with Southern plantation owners. Watie thought it best for the Cherokee to side with the Confederacy, while Ross thought it better to remain neutral. This split was due to the Union's and Southern state's involvement of the Trail of Tears, which complicated the nation's political outlook. Within the first year of the war, general consensus in the nation moved towards siding with the Confederacy.

Numerous skirmishes took place in the Trans-Mississippi area, which included the Cherokee Nation–West. There were seven officially recognized battles involving Native American units, who were either allied with the Confederate States of America or loyal to the United States government. 3,000 out of 21,000 members served as a soldier in the Confederacy. Several prominent members of the Cherokee Nation made contributions during the war:
 William Penn Adair (1830–1880), a Cherokee senator and diplomat, served as a Confederate Colonel
 Nimrod Jarrett Smith, Tsaladihi (1837–1893), a future Principal Chief of the Eastern Band, also served during the war
 Confederate Brig. General Stand Watie (also known as Degataga, (1806–1871), a signer of the Treaty of New Echota) raided Union positions in the Indian Territory with his 1st Cherokee Mounted Rifles Regiment of the Army of Trans-Mississippi well after the Confederacy had abandoned the area. He became the last Confederate general to surrender—on June 25, 1865.

After the war, the United States negotiated new treaties with the Five Civilized Tribes. All Five Tribes acknowledged "in writing that, because of the agreements they had made with the Confederate States during the Civil War, previous treaties made with the United States would no longer be upheld, thus prompting the need for a new treaty and an opportunity for the United States to fulfill its goal of wrenching more land" from their grasp. The new treaty established peace and requiring them to emancipate their slaves and to offer them citizenship and territory within the reservation if the freedmen chose to stay with the tribe, as the US had done for enslaved African Americans. The area was made part of the reconstruction of the former Confederate States overseen by military officers and governors appointed by the federal government.

A 2020 study contrasted the successful distribution of free land to former slaves in the Cherokee Nation with the failure to give former slaves in the Confederacy free land. The study found that even though levels of inequality in 1860 were similar in the Cherokee Nation and the Confederacy, former black slaves prospered in the Cherokee Nation over the next decades. The Cherokee Nation had lower levels of racial inequality where blacks saw higher incomes, higher literacy rates, and greater school attendance.

Nation's demise 

President Benjamin Harrison September 19, 1890, stopped the leasing of land in the Cherokee Outlet to cattlemen. The lease income had supported the Cherokee Nation in its efforts to prevent further encroachments on tribal lands.

From 1898–1906, beginning with the Curtis Act of 1898, the US federal government set about the dismantling of the Cherokee Nation's governmental and civic institutions, in preparation for the incorporation of the Indian Territory into the new state of Oklahoma. In response, the leaders of the Five Civilized Tribes sought to gain approval for a new State of Sequoyah in 1905 that would have a Native American constitution and government. The proposal received a cool reception in Congress and failed. The tribal government of the Cherokee Nation was dissolved in 1906. After this, the structure and function of the tribal government were not formally defined. The federal government occasionally designated chiefs of a provisional "Cherokee Nation", but usually just long enough to sign treaties.

As the shortcomings of the arrangement became increasingly evident to the Cherokee, a demand arose for the formation of a more permanent and accountable tribal government. New administrations at the federal level also recognized this issue, and the Franklin D. Roosevelt administration gained passage of the Indian Reorganization Act of 1934, encouraging tribes to re-establish governments and supporting more self-determination. The Cherokee convened a general convention on 8 August 1938 in Fairfield, Oklahoma, to elect a new Chief and reconstitute the Cherokee Nation.

Indian Territory 
The Cherokee Nation was divided into nine districts  named Canadian, Cooweescoowee, Delaware, Flint, Goingsnake, Illinois, Saline, Sequoyah, and Tahlequah (capital).

Cherokee capital 

Founded in 1838, Tahlequah was developed as the new capital of a united Cherokee Nation. It was named after the historic Great Tellico, an important Cherokee town and cultural center in present-day Tennessee that was one of the largest Cherokee towns ever established. The mostly European-American settlement of Tellico Plains later developed at the site. Indications of Cherokee influence found in and about Tahlequah. For example, street signs appear in both the Cherokee language—in the syllabary alphabet created by Sequoyah (ca. 1767–1843)—and in English.

Cherokee National Capitol 

Designed by architect C. W. Goodlander in the 'late Italianate' style, the Cherokee National Capitol was constructed between 1867 and 1869. Originally, it housed the nation's court as well as other offices. In 1961, the US Department of Interior designated it a National Historic Landmark.

People 

The Nation was made up of scattered peoples mostly living in the Cherokee Nation–West and the United Keetoowah Band of Cherokee Indians (both residing in the Indian Territory by the 1840s), and the Cherokee Nation–East (Eastern Band of Cherokee Indians); these became the three federally recognized tribes of Cherokee in the 20th century.

The Delaware 

In 1866, some Delaware (Lenape) were relocated to the Cherokee Nation from Kansas, where they had been sent in the 1830s.  Assigned to the northeast area of the Indian Territory, they united with the Cherokee Nation in 1867. The Delaware Tribes operated autonomously within the lands of the Cherokee Nation.

Natchez people 

The Natchez are a Native American people who originally lived in the Natchez Bluffs area. The present-day city of Natchez, Mississippi developed in their former territory. By the mid-eighteenth century, the Natchez people were defeated by French colonists and dispersed from there. Many survivors had been sold (by the French) into slavery in the West Indies. Others took refuge with allied tribes, one of which was the Cherokee.

The Shawnee 

Known as the Loyal Shawnee or Cherokee Shawnee, one band of Shawnee people relocated to Indian Territory with the Seneca people (Iroquois) in July 1831. The term "Loyal" came from their serving in the Union army during the American Civil War. European Americans encroached and settled on their lands after the war.

In 1869, the Cherokee Nation and Loyal Shawnee agreed that 722 of the Shawnee would be granted Cherokee citizenship. They settled in Craig and Rogers counties.

Swan Creek and Black River Chippewa 
The Anishinaabe-speaking Swan Creek and Black River Chippewa bands were removed from southeast Michigan to Kansas in 1839. After Kansas became a state and the Civil War ended, European-American settlers pushed out the Native Americans. Like the Delaware, the two Chippewa bands were relocated to the Cherokee Nation in 1866. They were so few in number that they eventually merged with the Cherokee.

Cherokee Freedmen 

The Cherokee Freedmen were former African American slaves who had been owned by citizens of the Cherokee Nation during the Antebellum Period. In 1863, President Lincoln issued the Emancipation Proclamation which granted citizenship to all freedmen in the Confederate States, including those held by the Cherokee. In reaching peace with the Cherokee, the U.S. government required the freedom of their slaves and full Cherokee citizenship for those who wanted to stay with the nation. This was later guaranteed in 1866 under a treaty with the United States.

Notable Cherokee Nation citizens
This list of historic people includes only documented Cherokee living in, or born into, the original Cherokee Nation who are not mentioned in the main article:

 Elias Boudinot, Galagina (1802–1839), statesman, orator, and editor; founded the first Cherokee newspaper, the Cherokee Phoenix. Assassinated by opponents for signing the New Echota Treaty to cede lands in the East.
 Ned Christie (1852–1892), statesman, Cherokee Nation senator, infamous outlaw
 Rear Admiral Joseph J. Clark (1893–1971), United States Navy, highest-ranking Native American in US military history.
 Doublehead, Taltsuska (d. 1807), a war leader during the Cherokee–American wars, led the Lower Cherokee, and signed land deals with the U.S.
 Junaluska (ca. 1775–1868), a veteran of the Creek War, who saved President Andrew Jackson's life.
 John Ridge, Skatlelohski (1792–1839), son of Major Ridge, statesman and signer of New Echota Treaty signer, assassinated by opponents.
 John Rollin Ridge, Cheesquatalawny, or "Yellow Bird" (1827–1867), grandson of Major Ridge, first Native American novelist.
 Clement V. Rogers (1839–1911), Cherokee senator, judge, cattleman, member of the Oklahoma Constitutional Convention.
 Will Rogers, (November 4, 1879 – August 15, 1935) Cherokee entertainer, roper, journalist, and author.
 John Ross, Guwisguwi (1790–1866), a veteran of the Red Stick War, Principal Chief in the east during Removal, and in the west.
 Redbird Smith (1850–1918), traditionalist, political activist, and chief of the Keetoowah Nighthawk Society.
 William Holland Thomas, Wil' Usdi (1805–1893), non-Native who was adopted into the tribe, founding Principal Chief of the Eastern Band of Cherokee Indians, commanding officer of the Thomas Legion of Cherokee Indians and Highlanders.
 Nancy Ward, Nanye-hi (ca. 1736–1822/4), Beloved Woman, diplomat.

In popular culture
 Indian Reservation (The Lament of the Cherokee Reservation Indian) (or the Cherokee Nation song) by Paul Revere & the Raiders tells of the plight of the Cherokee Nation.

See also 
 Cherokee military history
 Cherokee Commission
 Chief Vann House Historic Site
 Timeline of Cherokee removal

References

Further reading
 Gen. Stand Watie, Confederate Indians (Univ. of Oklahoma, 1998)

External links 
 Eastern Band of Cherokee Indians, the official site
 United Keetoowah Band of Cherokee Indians, the official site
 Cherokee Heritage Center, Park Hill, OK
 Compiled laws of the Cherokee Nation, published by authority of the National Council = ᏗᎦᏟᏌᏅᎯ ᏗᎧᎿᏩᏛᏍᏗ ᏣᎳᎩ ᎠᏰᎵ ᏕᎤᎲᎢ, ᎠᏰᎵ ᏗᏂᎳᏫᎩᏱ ᎤᎵᏁᏨᎯ ᏗᎦᏃᏣᎶᏗᏱ. 1881

 

 
1794 establishments in the United States
States and territories disestablished in 1907
Indian Territory
History of the Confederate States of America
Pre-statehood history of North Carolina
Pre-statehood history of Alabama
Pre-statehood history of Tennessee
Pre-statehood history of Oklahoma
History of the Southern United States
19th century in the United States
History of the Cherokee
19th-century Native Americans
Former regions and territories of the United States
States and territories established in 1794
1907 disestablishments in the United States
Former territorial entities in North America